U.S. Cup (also known as the USA Cup, United States Cup and Nike U.S. Cup) was a soccer competition held annually in the United States from 1992 to 2000, except for the World Cup years of 1994 and 1998. The tournament, hosted by the United States Soccer Federation, was contested between the United States and three guest teams.

The cup was created to train the American soccer team and to popularize the sport in the US before the men's 1994 FIFA World Cup. Originally known as the U.S. Cup, the name was changed to the Nike U.S. Cup after Nike, Inc. signed a ten-year, $120 million contract with the United States Soccer Federation to sponsor the U.S. national teams in October 1997.  As part of the contract, USSF added Nike's name to the U.S. Cup title.

In 1995, USSF added a women's competition which ran every year until 2002. The 2001 edition was abandoned after three matches due to the September 11 attacks.

Format
The cup was traditionally played in a single round-robin format between the four participating national teams.

The 1999 edition of the men's and 2000 edition of the women's tournaments, were played in single elimination format. The first round was the semifinals. The losers of the semifinals played for third place, and the winners of the semifinals played the Final match.

List of champions

Men's tournament

Women's tournament

Titles by country

Men's tournament
  3 times (1992, 1995, 2000)
  3 times (1996, 1997, 1999)
  1 time (1993)

Women's tournament
  7 times (all, except for the abandoned 2001 edition)

National team appearances

Men’s

Women’s
Number of appearance excludes the abandoned 2001 edition.

Venues
Frontier Field, Rochester, NY 1998 (2 games)
RFK Stadium, Washington, DC-1992, 1993 (2 games), 1995 (2 games), 1996, 2000
Foxboro Stadium, Foxborough, MA-1992 (2 games), 1993, 1995, 1996, 2000
Rose Bowl, Pasadena, CA-1996, 1997 (4 games)
Soldier Field, Chicago, IL-1992 (2 games), 1993, 2000
Giants Stadium, East Rutherford, NJ-1996 (2 games), 2000 (2 games)
Qualcomm Stadium, San Diego, CA-1997 (2 games), 1999 (2 games)
Yale Bowl, New Haven, CT-1992, 1993
Rutgers Stadium, Piscataway, NJ-1995 (2 games)
Cotton Bowl, Dallas, TX-1996, 2000
Los Angeles Memorial Coliseum, Los Angeles, CA-1999 (2 games)
Pontiac Silverdome, Pontiac, MI-1993

References

External links
 Men's US Cup at RSSSF
 Women's US Cup at RSSSF

 
International association football competitions hosted by the United States
Defunct international association football competitions in North America
Recurring sporting events established in 1992
Recurring events disestablished in 2002
1992 establishments in the United States
2002 disestablishments in the United States